The 2008 Rexall Edmonton Indy was the thirteenth round of the 2008 IndyCar Series season, and was held on July 26, 2008, at Rexall Speedway in Edmonton, Alberta, Canada. The race was won by Scott Dixon, followed by Hélio Castroneves and Justin Wilson. Although it was the fourth edition of the Grand Prix, it was the first race in the IndyCar Series, but also the first IndyCar Series race to be held in Canada.

Qualifying results

Race

Caution flags

Notes

 Fastest Lap Will Power: 1:02.023 (Lap 68)
 Average Speed 96.967 mph

Attendance
Race weekend attendance was estimated 160,000.

References

2008 in IndyCar
2008
Rexall Edmonton Indy
Rexall Edmonton Indy
Rexall Edmonton Indy